Mitromorpha mifsudi is a species of sea snail, a marine gastropod mollusk in the family Mitromorphidae.

Description
The length of the shell varies between 5 mm and 7 mm.

Distribution
This marine species occurs off Sardinia, Italy.

References

External links
 Amati B., Smriglio C. & Oliverio M. (2015). Revision of the Recent Mediterranean species of Mitromorpha Carpenter, 1865 (Gastropoda, Conoidea, Mitromorphidae) with the description of seven new species. Zootaxa. 3931(2): 151–195
 

mifsudi
Gastropods described in 2015